"Blasphemous Rumours"/"Somebody" is Depeche Mode's twelfth UK single and first double A-side single, released on 29 October 1984. Both A-side songs are from the album Some Great Reward.

Song information

Blasphemous Rumours 
The verses to "Blasphemous Rumours" describe a 16-year-old girl who attempts suicide but fails. She experiences a religious revival but then "Hit by a car / Ended up / On a life support machine" (from the lyrics). The chorus uses these incidents to conclude, "I don't want to start any blasphemous rumours / But I think that God's got a sick sense of humour / And when I die, I expect to find him laughing." Like other songs on Some Great Reward, the song uses a dense sound with extensive sampled percussion. The song stems from the times that Martin Gore would go with bandmate Andy Fletcher and former bandmate Vince Clarke to the church. When Martin initially showed Andy the song, he found it quite offensive and said, "It certainly verges on the offensive."

When Depeche Mode announced that they were planning to release "Blasphemous Rumours" as a single, pushback from the religious community resulted, and consequently, the band decided as a compromise to release the single as a double-A side with "Somebody."

Somebody 
"Somebody", which was sung by Martin Gore in the studio in the nude, includes one of Gore's "little twists", where the song builds as if it is a song about finding your perfect love, only to have him reveal at the end "though things like this make me sick / in a case like this I'll get away with it."

In a significant moment in the Tour of the Universe at the Royal Albert Hall, Alan Wilder made a surprise appearance accompanying by playing the piano while Martin Gore sang "Somebody".

Track listings
All songs written by Martin Gore except:
 "Ice Machine" by Vince Clarke
 "Two Minute Warning" by Alan Wilder

7″: Mute / 7Bong7 (UK) 
 "Blasphemous Rumours" – 5:06
 "Somebody (Remix)" – 4:19

7″ EP: Mute / 7Bong7E (UK) 
 "Somebody (Remix)" – 4:19
 "Everything Counts (Live)" - 5:53
 "Blasphemous Rumours" – 5:06
 "Told You So (Live Version)" - 4:54

12″: Mute / 12Bong7 (UK) 
 "Blasphemous Rumours" – 6:20
 "Somebody (Live)" – 4:26
 "Two Minute Warning (Live)" – 4:36
 "Ice Machine (Live)" – 3:45
 "Everything Counts (Live)" – 5:53
 This version of the single was also released on CD. Intercord 826.839. No Bong number, same cover as the vinyl version.

CD: Mute / CDBong7 (UK) 
 "Blasphemous Rumours" – 6:20
 "Told You So (Live)" – 4:56
 "Somebody (Remix)" – 4:19
 "Everything Counts (Live)" – 5:53
 The CD single was released in 1991 as part of the singles box set compilations.

All live tracks recorded at the Empire Theatre in Liverpool, England on 29 September 1984.

Charts

References

External links
 Single information from the official Depeche Mode web site
 Allmusic review 

1984 songs
1984 singles
Depeche Mode songs
Songs about suicide
Songs written by Martin Gore
Song recordings produced by Daniel Miller
Song recordings produced by Gareth Jones
Teenage tragedy songs
Mute Records singles
Songs critical of religion
New wave ballads
UK Independent Singles Chart number-one singles